Erebia lefebvrei, or Lefèbvre's ringlet, is a member of the subfamily Satyridae of the family Nymphalidae. This brown is found in France. It has been considered a subspecies of Erebia melas.

Description

References

Erebia
Butterflies described in 1828
Butterflies of Europe